Lucas Perrin (born 19 November 1998) is a French professional footballer who plays as a defender for Ligue 1 side Strasbourg

Club career

Marseille 
Perrin made his professional debut on 24 September 2019 in a Ligue 1 game against Dijon. He started the match and played the full 90 minutes in a 0–0 away draw.

On 30 June 2020 he extended his contract with the club.

Career statistics

Club 

1Includes Coupe de France.

References

External links 
 France profile at FFF
 Marseille profile 
 
 

1998 births
Living people
Footballers from Marseille
Association football defenders
French footballers
France youth international footballers
Olympique de Marseille players
RC Strasbourg Alsace players
Ligue 1 players
Championnat National 2 players